Excellent Italian Greyhound is Shellac's fourth album, released on June 5, 2007. The album's title is a reference to drummer Todd Trainer's Italian Greyhound, Uffizi, who appears on the album's cover. The album was recorded at Electrical Audio and mastered at Abbey Road by Steve Rooke. The drawings for Excellent Italian Greyhound were created by Jay Ryan from the band Dianogah. As well as a hand screened obi sleeve surrounding the jacket, there are several pictures taken by Joel Larson. As with 1000 Hurts, the vinyl pressing of the album includes an unmarked CD version at no extra charge (CD and LP+CD releases are similarly priced). The band encourages listeners to purchase the vinyl to hear the record as it was intended.

In November 2009, NME included the album on their list of "The Top 100 Greatest Albums Of The Decade".

Voice-over artist, Ken Nordine, appears uncredited on the song "Genuine Lulabelle". The introduction to "Spoke" includes a cover version of the "Rotosound Strings" radio commercial from The Who's 1967 album The Who Sell Out.

In the run-out groove, there is a text etching. Side One - "Pronto Prova..." Side Two - "A Isamu Sta Lapa!"

The song "Genuine Lulabelle" features clips of the Homestar Runner character Strong Bad reciting lines from the song.

Track listing

Charts
Album - Billboard (North America)

References

2007 albums
Shellac (band) albums
Touch and Go Records albums